NGC 516 is a lenticular galaxy located in the constellation of Pisces. It was discovered on September 25, 1862 by Heinrich d'Arrest.

See also 
 Lenticular galaxy 
 List of NGC objects (1–1000)
 Pisces (constellation)

References

External links 
 
 
 SEDS

0516
00946
05148
1448
18620925
NGC 516
NGC 516
Discoveries by Heinrich Louis d'Arrest